Robert Charles Wisden (Brighton, 2 June 1958) is an English-born, Canadian actor who has an extensive career in Canadian and American film and television, for which he has won a Gemini Award. 
Best known for playing U.S. President Richard Nixon in the 2009 American neo-noir superhero film Watchmen, he has acted on many series, including Da Vinci's Inquest, Smallville, The X-Files, Battlestar Galactica, Buffy the Vampire Slayer, Highlander and Jeremiah.

Early life
Born in 1958 in Brighton, East Sussex in England, Wisden moved with his family from Britain to Canada when he was fifteen. He made his film debut in Firebird 2015 AD (1981), landing a key supporting part alongside Darren McGavin and Doug McClure. Four years later he started his television career starring as Terry Dunne in Atom Egoyan's In This Corner (1985).

Career

Acting
Wisden is best known for his role as United States President Richard Nixon in Zack Snyder's film adaptation of the DC graphic novel Watchmen, Chief Coroner James Flynn in the Canadian TV series Da Vinci's Inquest, and Ken Browning in Final Destination. In 1994, he landed a supporting role in the epic turn-of-the-20th-century war drama Legends of the Fall. He played Robert Patrick Modell - a character created by Vince Gilligan - in the classic The X-Files episode Pusher (1996) and the 1998 follow-up episode Kitsunegari.

Teaching
In 2006, Wisden graduated from Simon Fraser University with a Bachelor of Education degree. He taught at Heritage Woods Secondary School for two school years (2006 - 2007), substituting for the main drama teacher. He went on to become the Head of Theater Arts at St.George's School for Boys in Vancouver, British Columbia. In 2019, Wisden realised a long-held dream when he oversaw the school's successful production of Les Misérables.

Awards
In 2000, he won a Gemini Award for Best Performance by an Actor in a Featured Supporting Role in a Dramatic Program or Mini-Series for The Sheldon Kennedy Story (1999).

Filmography

Film
Firebird 2015 AD (1981) - Cam 
Milk and Honey (1988)
Blood Clan (1990) - Stuart Roos
Stay Tuned (1992) - 3 Men and Rosemary's Baby
Impolite (1992) - Jack Yeats
Look Who's Talking Now (1993) - Ranger
Legends of the Fall (1994) - John T. O'Banion
The War Between Us (1996) - Ed Parnum
Excess Baggage (1997) - Detective Sims
Medusa's Child (1997) - Colonel Spencer
Floating Away (1998) - Armand
In the Name of the People (2000) - DA Paul McMillan
Final Destination (2000) - Ken Browning
Criss Cross (2001) - Zach
Snow Queen (2002) - Wolfgang
Watchmen (2009) - Richard Nixon
Driven to Kill (2009) - Terry Goldstein

Television
In This Corner (1986) - Terry Dunne
Glory Enough for All (1988) - Charles Herbert Best
9B (1989) - Bob Dawson
The Odyssey (1993–1994) - Brad Ziegler
The Outer Limits (1995-1999) - Justin Wells / Sam Winter
Highlander: The Series "The Return of Amanda" (1993) & "The Messenger" (1996) - Col. William Everett Culbraith / Werner
The X-Files (1996–1998) - Robert Patrick Modell
Poltergeist: The Legacy (1997-1999) - Will Thomas / James Donlon
Madison (1997) - Richard Long
Stargate SG-1 (1997–2005) (4 episodes) - Lt. Colonel Bert Samuels
Millennium (1997-1998) - Chris Carmody / Gordon Roberts
Cold Squad (1998-2004) - Nick Kingsman / Neil Brice
Welcome to Paradox (1998) - John Hammond
Da Vinci's Inquest (1998–2000) - Chief Coroner James Flynn
Secret Cutting (2000) - Russell Cottrell
Smallville (2001–2004) - Gabriel Sullivan
Jeremiah (2002–2003) - Devon
The Elizabeth Smart Story (2003) - Jim Smart
Battlestar Galactica (2005) - Wallace Gray
Supervolcano (2005) - Kenneth Wylie

References

External links
 

1958 births
English male film actors
English male television actors
English emigrants to Canada
Best Supporting Actor in a Television Film or Miniseries Canadian Screen Award winners
Living people
Male actors from Vancouver
People from Brighton
Canadian male film actors
Canadian male television actors